Ōzora is a town in Abashiri District, Okhotsk Subprefecture, Hokkaidō, Japan.

Ōzora may also refer to:

Ōzora (surname), a Japanese surname
Ohzora Publishing, a josei manga publisher in Japan
Ohzora (satellite), a Japanese weather satellite
5214 Oozora, an asteroid
Ōzora (train), a JR Hokkaido train service

See also
Ozora, a Hungarian village
Ózora or Usora, a historic region in Bosnia
Ozora, Missouri, a populated place in the United States
Aozora (disambiguation), Japanese word for blue sky